The 2017 Colorado Classic was a four-stage 2.HC event on the 2017 UCI America Tour.

Teams
Sixteen teams started the race. Each team had a maximum of six riders:

Route

Final standings

General classification 
The general classification was won by Manuel Senni.

Points classification 
The points classification was won by Travis McCabe.

Mountains classification 
The mountain classification was won by Serghei Tvetcov (where he was also named best Colorado rider).

Best young classification 
The youth classification was won by Jhonatan Narváez.

Team classification

References 

2017 UCI America Tour
2017 in American sports
2017 in sports in Colorado
August 2017 sports events in the United States